This is a list of National Hockey League players of Indian descent.

List
Players with at least one game of NHL experience:

Bold: organization by which player is currently playing

See also

Black players in ice hockey
List of black NHL players
Race and ethnicity in the NHL

References

National Hockey League lists
Canadian sportspeople of Indian descent